is a city in the northern part of Hyōgo Prefecture, Japan.

Geography 
Toyooka is located in the northern part of Hyōgo Prefecture and the Kinki region, facing the Sea of Japan in the north. It lies entirely within the San'in Kaigan Geopark. The Maruyama River flows through the central part of the city, and the Toyooka Basin, which is the largest basin in the Tajima region, spreads out in the central part of the city. Toyooka is located in the "snow country" of Japan and is characterized by heavy accumulations of snow in winter. One of Toyooka's famous geological features is a basalt cave called Gembudō. Gembudō was formed 1.6 million years ago from the eruption of an ancient volcano. In 1926, Professor Motonori Matuyama of Kyoto University first proposed the theory of geomagnetic polarity reversal at Genbudo after discovering it had a reverse magnetization.

The wetlands of Toyooka provide an important habitat for the oriental stork. After becoming extinct in the wild in the 1970s, Toyooka began a captive breeding program. After a quarter of a century of breeding efforts, the first oriental stork chick was born in 1989. In 2005 Toyooka released 5 captively bred storks, which bred successfully in the wild. As of June 2015 there are 72 wild oriental white storks in Toyooka.

The hot spring resort Kinosaki Onsen is located within Toyooka.

Neighbouring municipalities 
Hyōgo Prefecture
 Asago
 Kami
 Yabu
Kyoto Prefecture
 Fukuchiyama
 Kyotango
 Yosano

Climate
Kyōtango has a humid climate (Köppen Cfa) characterized by warm, wet summers and cold winters with heavy snowfall.  Although part of the Kansai region and Hyōgo Prefecture, Toyooka has a climate much more similar to the Hokuriku region of Chūbu and Tōhoku. Unlike Osaka or Kobe, which rarely see significant snowfall during the winter, Toyooka, exposed to the northerly winter winds driven by the Siberian High and Aleutian Low, receives  of snowfall per year, though melt rates are high even during the winter and the maximum cover on the ground is typically only  and has never exceeded . Precipitation is much heavier than in central Kansai, though less heavy than in the Kii Peninsula or the Hokuriku region proper.

Demographics
Per Japanese census data, the population of Toyooka in 2020 is 77,489 people. Toyooka has been conducting censuses since 1950.

History
The area of Toyooka was the center of ancient Tajima Province in the early 8th century and the location of the provincial capital and the Tajima Kokubun-ji. From the Muromachi period to the end of the Sengoku period, the area was under the stronghold of the powerful Yamana clan. Under the Edo Period Tokugawa shogunate, Toyooka Domain and Izushi Domain existed within the borders of what is now the city of Toyooka. In 1871, following the Meiji restoration, "Toyooka Prefecture" incorporating all of the former feudal territories within Tajima, Tango and Tanba Provinces was created. It was abolished on August 21, 1876, when Hyōgo Prefecture was created. The town of Toyooka was officially established with the creation of the modern municipalities system on April 1, 1889. The 1925 North Tajima earthquake created severe damage in Toyooka, with official government reports, indicating that there were 428 fatalities, 1,016 injuries, 7,863 buildings destroyed, and 45,659 houses damaged by collapse or fire.

The city of Toyooka was created on April 1, 1950 by the merger of Toyooka with neighboring Gosho, Nitta, and Nakasuji villages. The city expanded on April 1, 1955 by annexing Nasa and Minato villages. On April 1, 2005, the towns of Kinosaki, Hidaka and Takeno (all from Kinosaki District) and the towns of Izushi and Tantō (both from Izushi District) were merged into Toyooka.

Government
Toyooka has a mayor-council form of government with a directly elected mayor and a unicameral city council of 24 members. Toyooka contributes one member to the Hyogo Prefectural Assembly. In terms of national politics, the city is part of Hyōgo 5th district of the lower house of the Diet of Japan.

Economy
Toyooka has mostly a rural economy based on agriculture and commercial fishing.

Education
Toyooka has 26 public elementary schools and nine public middle schools operated by the city government and two public high schools operated by the Hyōgo Prefectural Department of Education. There is also one private middle school and one private high school. The Toyooka Junior College and the Professional College of Arts and Tourism are also located in the city. The prefecture also operates two special education schools for the handicapped.

Transportation

Railway 
The Sanin Main Line provides a JR rail connection to Kyoto, and direct trains to Osaka are available via Fukuchiyama. Direct Express trains take about 2.5 hours from Osaka to Toyooka.

 JR West – San'in Main Line
  -  -  -  -  - 
 Kyoto Tango Railway – Miyazu Line
  -

Highways 
  Kitakinki-Toyooka Expressway

Airport 
Tajima Airport serves Toyooka and its area with two direct flights a day to Osaka Itami Airport

Sister cities
 Ueda, Nagano Prefecture (since the former city of Ueda and the former town of Izushi were sister cities before the recent creation of both Toyooka and Ueda)
 Gyeongju, South Korea
 Alicante, Spain (1996)

Local attractions 
 Kinosaki Onsen
 Izushi Castle
 Takeno Beach
 Mount Kannabe
 Kinosaki Marine World
 Hyōgo Prefectural Stork Nature Park
 Tajima Kokubun-ji ruins

References

External links

 

Cities in Hyōgo Prefecture
Toyooka, Hyōgo
Populated coastal places in Japan